Dorcadion rufogenum is a species of beetle in the family Cerambycidae. It was described by Reitter in 1895. It is known from China and Kazakhstan.

Subspecies
 Dorcadion rufogenum discoflavovittatum Breuning, 1946
 Dorcadion rufogenum rufogenum Reitter, 1895

References

rufogenum
Beetles described in 1895